Jane Miranda Blazeby is a professor of surgical medicine at the University of Bristol and in 2021 she was elected a fellow of the Academy of Medical Sciences. She is known for her work on the quality of life experienced by people following surgery.

Education and career 
Blazeby has a BSc (1985), an M.B. (1998), and an M.D. (1999) from the University of Bristol. Blazeby also holds an MSc in Epidemiology and Public Health from the University of London (2005). As of 2006 she is a professor of surgery at the University of Bristol

Career 
In 2000, Blazeby was awarded a Medical Research Council Clinician Scientist award to investigate principles and practices of outcome measures in surgical oncology. She is also known for her work on patient-reported outcomes and research into optional wound dressings following surgery.

Selected publications
As of 2022 Blazeby has an h-index of 87 with over 28000 citations to her research.

Honors and awards 
In 2021 she was elected as a fellow of the Academy of Medical Sciences.

References

External links 

Living people
Alumni of the University of Bristol
Alumni of the University of London
Academics of the University of Bristol
Fellows of the Royal College of Surgeons
British surgeons
Year of birth missing (living people)